Upper Asaro Rural LLG is a local-level government (LLG) of Eastern Highlands Province, Papua New Guinea. The Dano language, also known as Upper Asaro, is spoken in the LLG.

Wards
01. Anengu
02. Kombiangu/Amaiufa
03. Namta
04. Pikosa
05. Aneguyufa
06. Kwonggi No. 1
07. Kwonggi No. 2
08. Wesan

References

Local-level governments of Eastern Highlands Province